The 1957–58 NHL season was the 41st season of the National Hockey League. The Montreal Canadiens won the Stanley Cup for the third consecutive season, defeating the Boston Bruins four games to two in the best-of-seven final series.

League business

It was announced in September that Senator Hartland Molson had purchased 60% stock from the Canadian Arena Company and the Montreal Canadiens from Senator Donat Raymond.

Organization of Players' Association

Doug Harvey and Ted Lindsay led the drive to form (on February 11, 1957) the National Hockey League Players' Association (NHLPA), a workers' labour association, and sued the NHL over the issue of player pensions, salaries during training camp, meal allowances, remuneration for exhibition games and a no-trade clause after six years service. Lindsay lost his captaincy of the Detroit Red Wings and was traded to Chicago, on July 23, 1957, in an effort to intimidate the players.

After the NHL declined to negotiate with the players over benefits and would not open the books on the pension plan, the player's association filed an antitrust lawsuit on October 10, 1957. The lawsuit alleged the monopolization of the professional hockey industry since 1926, in violation of the Sherman and Clayton Antitrust Acts. Furthermore, On November 6, 1957, the Toronto Maple Leafs players voted unanimously to certify the union.

The NHL started to fight back. First, they traded Lindsay to Chicago to separate him from the Red Wings, the American team the NHLPA had targeted for a certification vote. Next, Jack Adams spread false stories in the press alleging various slanders had been made by Lindsay against the Red Wings players, and produced a fake contract to the press showing an over-inflated salary for Lindsay, greater than Hart Trophy MVP, teammate and friend Gordie Howe. The ruse worked and the Red Wings players decided to dis-associate themselves from the NHLPA on November 13, 1957.

Part of the problem of organizing the players was confusion about the type of association they were forming. The NHLPA had applied, in Canada, to the Ontario Labour Relations Board for certification, but the ORLB had no experience with workers like hockey players. NHLPA members negotiated individual contracts and wanted to continue to bargain this way. The matter of the NHLPA being an actual union, where the members were bound together and fought for collective agreements, was unclear. The NHLPA legal counsel, Milton Mound, addressed this, saying that the players would negotiate on matters common to all players (pensions, allowances) but retained the right to individual contracts. The League, and especially Conn Smythe, argued that players were forming a "trade union" and were no better than "commies" and would lose things like individual bonuses. He believed that hockey players were in the business of being "independent contractors" and had no right or reason for a collective organization.

The confusion worried both employer and employee. The situation was exacerbated by the certification process. The OLRB was taking time, and no one knew how this transnational association would work, or how it would be recognized by the US National Labor Relations Board. In fact, the NLRB asked the NHLPA to withdraw its unfair labor practices charge on November 20, 1957, arguing it did not have jurisdiction. This was followed by the Montreal Canadiens players rejection of the association in early January, 1958.

The OLRB resumed meeting on January 7, but both the League and the players were concerned. The NHL was convinced that the ORLB was not going to dismiss the application, regardless of how they ruled on the union versus association issue, and the players were worried (given the setbacks in Detroit and Montreal) that they didn't have grounds to actually form an association (especially since they didn't want to be a traditional "union.")

The players and owners both felt pressure to conclude something, so they gathered, without lawyers, for a 13-hour meeting in the boardroom of the Biltmore Hotel in Palm Beach, just after the regular NHL winter meetings. In an out-of-court settlement on February 5, 1958, the NHL promised:

 a $7,000 minimum wage (which was, in actuality, the unofficial League norm,)
 an increase in pension benefits,
 increased hospitalization benefits,
 a limit on the number of exhibition games,
 the player shall be the sole judge of his physical fitness to play after injury.

Ross concludes:

In the end, the players had little to show for their rebellion. A few cosmetic changes were made, but even the communication problem did not seem to have been solved. Over the ensuing seasons the Owner-Player Council did not even meet regularly, and paternalism prevailed. It was not until 1967 that the idea of a union once again gained currency, again in an era of general revived interest across all the major league sports.

The fundamental question at the root of the NHLPA failure was whether players really were laborers who could form a trade union. Seemingly caught in a space both commercial and non-commercial, players felt uneasy locating themselves wholly within either. This in itself reflected the success of the owners in using cultural formations to restrain their labor force. Led by Conn Smythe, the league appealed to cultural bonds of loyalty and tradition as justifications for retaining the existing economic structure of labor-management relations, long after other industries had been forced by the state to move toward formal, union-led collective bargaining arrangements.

Regular season

This season saw the Montreal Canadiens regain first place overall, while the previous season's leader, the Detroit Red Wings, slipped to third. Montreal's Maurice "Rocket" Richard became the first NHL player to score 500 career goals, Jacques Plante won his third straight Vezina Trophy, and Doug Harvey his fourth straight Norris Trophy.

Glenn Hall, after two playoff years in which the Wings were eliminated, was traded, along with Ted Lindsay to the Chicago Black Hawks and Terry Sawchuk was brought back to Detroit in a deal that saw Larry Hillman and Johnny Bucyk go to Boston. Chicago almost made the playoffs, and Hall's goaltending, including seven shutouts, one of which was in his debut with the Hawks, made him a contender for the Hart Trophy.

On October 19, 1957, Rocket Richard, in a 3–1 win over Chicago, scored his 500th career goal, against Glenn Hall. He immediately dedicated it to his old coach Dick Irvin, who had died on May 15, 1957, after a long bout with bone cancer.

When Marcel Paille was brought up to the Rangers from Providence of the AHL for the ailing Gump Worsley, he sparkled, and Worsley was sent down to Providence, though he was eventually recalled. Worsley had his finest campaign up to this point, with a 2.32 goals-against average and four shutouts, and the Rangers finished second – their highest finish since 1941–42.

Two contenders for the Calder Memorial Trophy, Chicago's Bobby Hull and the Toronto Maple Leafs' Frank Mahovlich, battled all season for rookie honours. Mahovlich prevailed, although the Maple Leafs finished last in the NHL.

This season also saw the first player of African descent play in the league. Willie O'Ree suited up with the Boston Bruins on January 18, 1958, in a game against the Canadiens in Montreal.

Final standings

Playoffs
The first-place Montreal Canadiens swept the third-place Detroit Red Wings to qualify for the Finals. In the other semifinal, the fourth-place Boston Bruins upset the second-seeded New York Rangers in six games to reach the Finals.

Playoff bracket

Semifinals

(1) Montreal Canadiens vs. (3) Detroit Red Wings

(2) New York Rangers vs. (4) Boston Bruins

Stanley Cup Finals

The Canadiens made their eighth consecutive appearance in the Stanley Cup Finals and defeated the Bruins in six games. It was the Canadiens' third consecutive Stanley Cup triumph.

Awards

All-Star teams

Player statistics

Scoring leaders
Note: GP = Games played, G = Goals, A = Assists, PTS = Points, PIM = Penalties in minutes

Leading goaltenders

Note: GP = Games played; Min = Minutes played; GA = Goals against; GAA = Goals against average; W = Wins; L = Losses; T = Ties; SO = Shutouts

Coaches
Boston Bruins: Milt Schmidt
Chicago Black Hawks: Rudy Pilous
Detroit Red Wings: Jimmy Skinner
Montreal Canadiens: Toe Blake
New York Rangers: Phil Watson
Toronto Maple Leafs: Billy Reay

Debuts
The following is a list of players of note who played their first NHL game in 1957–58 (listed with their first team, asterisk(*) marks debut in playoffs):
Willie O'Ree, Boston Bruins (first-ever black player to play in the NHL)
Bobby Hull, Chicago Black Hawks
Murray Oliver, Detroit Red Wings
Ab McDonald*, Montreal Canadiens
Carl Brewer, Toronto Maple Leafs
Bob Nevin, Toronto Maple Leafs

Last games
The following is a list of players of note who played their last game in the NHL in 1957–58 (listed with their last team):
Johnny Peirson, Boston Bruins
Jimmy Thomson, Chicago Black Hawks
Tony Leswick, Detroit Red Wings
Metro Prystai, Detroit Red Wings
Floyd Curry, Montreal Canadiens
Sid Smith, Toronto Maple Leafs

See also
1957-58 NHL transactions
1957 NHL Intraleague Draft
List of Stanley Cup champions
National Hockey League All-Star Game
1957 in sports
1958 in sports

References

 
 
 
 
 

 

 
Notes

External links
Hockey Database
NHL.com

 
1957–58 in American ice hockey by league
1957–58 in Canadian ice hockey by league